Kristin Klein Keefe ( Kristin Magdalen Klein; born March 20, 1970, in Santa Monica, California) is an American retired volleyball player who played as an outside hitter. She represented the USA National Women's Team at the 1996 Summer Olympics in Atlanta, Georgia, finishing in seventh place. She played college women's volleyball for Stanford University, where she was a four-time All-American and the 1991 Women's Volleyball National Player of the Year.

Klein joined the USA national team in August 1992, and played as a member of the United States 'B'-team at the 1991 Pan American Games and 1991 Summer Universiade. She won the bronze medal at the World Student Games and placed fifth at the Pan Am Games.

Klein is married to former Stanford basketball and NBA player Adam Keefe; both were inducted into the Stanford Athletic Hall of Fame in 2000. They have two daughters, Caitlin and Michaela, who were on the Stanford women's volleyball team from 2016 to 2020. They also have a son, James, who is on the Stanford men's basketball team.

International competitions
1991 – Pan American Games
1991 – World University Games
1993 – NORCECA Zone Championship (silver)
1994 – World Grand Prix
1994 – World Championship
1995 – NORCECA Zone Championship
1995 – World Grand Prix (gold)
1996 – Summer Olympics (7th place)

References

US Olympic Team
Profile

1970 births
Living people
American women's volleyball players
Volleyball players at the 1996 Summer Olympics
Olympic volleyball players of the United States
Sportspeople from Santa Monica, California
Stanford Cardinal women's volleyball players
Outside hitters
Pan American Games medalists in volleyball
Pan American Games silver medalists for the United States
Medalists at the 1995 Pan American Games